Regent Street railway station, formerly known as the Mortuary railway station, was a railway station on Sydney's Rookwood Cemetery railway line. Funeral trains departed from the station, bound for Rookwood Cemetery. The station found later use as a part of Sydney Yard. The ornate Gothic building is still standing on the western side of Sydney Yard at Chippendale, close to Central railway station and Railway Square. It was added to the New South Wales State Heritage Register on 2 April 1999.

History
The station opened as Mortuary on 29 June 1869. At some point, its name was changed to Regent Street, after the street on which it is located. It has also been referred to by different names, including the Necropolis Receiving Station and the Mortuary Station. The station was built as part of the larger Rookwood Cemetery line. It was completed on 22 March 1869 but had been used since 1 January 1869. It was also one end of the service that ran to the Woronora General Cemetery in Sutherland, located south of Sydney, and for trains heading to Sandgate Cemetery in Newcastle.

This and the Receiving House station at Rookwood Cemetery were designed by colonial architect James Barnet in the Victorian Free Gothic style, using elements from the Venetian 13th century Gothic style. Principal sculptors Thomas Ducket and Henry Apperly worked on the elaborate carvings that were a feature of the stations, including angels, cherubs, and gargoyles. Although both buildings were designed to look like churches, both in structure and in the symbolic elements that adorned them, they were never used as places of worship.

The building was used as the terminus for funeral trains till 1938 only. When the rail funeral business gave way to road corteges and motor hearses, rail services were restricted to weekends, and then finally curtailed. On 3 April 1948, trains were withdrawn and the cemetery line closed. Trains left from the main terminus platforms over the final ten years of the funeral rail service. There being no call for the rail hearse, the Mortuary Station ceased to function in the capacity of its original purpose.

From 14 March 1938, Mortuary Station was used for the consignment of horses and dogs, and its name changed to Regent Street. From February 1950 it was used as a parcels dispatch, at which time catenary wires were placed inside the rail pavilion and (apparently at this same time) the easternmost arches at either end were removed of ornament on the inner face to allow for the passage of larger rail vehicles. The sight of an electric mail vehicle standing under the arches was common in the 1950s and 1960s.

It was restored by the State Rail Authority in 1985. By this time it had also been classified by the National Trust of Australia and the Australian Heritage Commission and made part of Permanent Conservation by the Heritage Council of New South Wales. The cost of restoring the site was approximately A$600,000. It was reopened on 21 April 1985 by Premier Neville Wran.

From 1986 to 1989, a pancake restaurant, the Magic Mortuary was operated using railway carriages to house the diners. For this purpose, two dining cars, an event car (for exhibitions and theatrical presentations) and a staff amenities car were located on the tracks alongside the platform. Associated crafts and gifts were sold from the ticket office and displays mounted on the platform areas.

Subsequently, the station has occasionally been used as a venue to launch special train services and informative displays, and as a hired function centre. In the early 2000s the platform was shortened at the northern end to make way for a bus terminus.

As part of the construction of the Sydney Metro City & Southwest, a bridge was built across the southern end of the platform in 2018.

Description 

The station building is predominantly constructed from sandstone; two varieties of colour being used – brown for all columns, cornices, etc. and white for the plain surfaces. It consists of a long low-roofed pavilion of nine bays converting a single railway track that enters and leaves the building through a wide Gothic arch at either end. A second arch at either end provides access to the raised stone platform that occupies half the sheltered area. An octagonal pavilion of open arches serves as a port cochere on the street side of the platform; its steeply pitched roof resolves into a delicate fleche, which rises above the rest of the building to give the station a landmark character. The outer wall of the platform pavilion (on the eastern side of the railway track) is composed of nine great arches on banded cylindrical columns with leafy capitals.

The columns rise from square tapered bases, each a huge block as high as the human figure. At the corners of the pavilion, the arches rest on squared piers that are twice the bulk of the columns. The piers have enriched stringcourses with stiff-leaf detail like the column capitals. The spandrels between the arches contain circular medallions with carved centre. Walls are of plain ashlar courses, rising to a highly ornamented corbel table Winds with a high-pitched roof rising into a square fleche set on the diagonal, which acts as a bell turret. The balance of the arches and strong cornice-line with the sweep of the roof makes for a great architecture. In the angles between the octagonal porch and the station pavilion are set the less formal structures of rest rooms and toilets; the chimneys of the rest room fireplaces accentuate the angled inner corners. These elements are bound into the tighter structure of the conjoined pavilions by stringcourse and cornice holding them like straps.

See also

[{ "type": "ExternalData", "service": "geoshape", "ids": "Q2373736", "properties":{"fill-opacity": 1}},{ "type": "ExternalData", "service": "page", "title": "Central station precinct, Sydney.map"}]
Architecture of Sydney
Rail transport in New South Wales
All Saints Church, Canberra

References

Attribution

External links

Neighbouring stations

Disused railway stations in Sydney
Gothic Revival architecture in Sydney
James Barnet buildings in Sydney
Railway stations in Australia opened in 1869
Victorian architecture in Sydney
New South Wales State Heritage Register
Sandstone buildings in Australia
Chippendale, New South Wales